The Norwegian Gymnastics Federation (NGTF) is the national gymnastics association in Norway.

The Norwegian Gymnastics Federation was founded in 1890 as De Norske Turn- og Gymnastikkforeninger, and gymnastics was the first sport in Norway to be organized as a federation. The federation is a member of the Norwegian Confederation of Sports (NIF), the European Union of Gymnastics (UEG) and the International Federation of Gymnastics (FIG). Its headquarters are in Oslo.

As of 2016, its general secretary is Øistein Leren, and its president is Kristin Gilbert.

References

Gymnastics in Norway
Gymnastics
Norway
1890 establishments in Norway
Organisations based in Oslo
Sports organizations established in 1890